Blundells Copse is a local nature reserve in the suburb of Tilehurst in the town of Reading, UK. The nature reserve is under the management of the Reading Borough Council and, along with Lousehill Copse and McIlroy Park, is part of West Reading Woodlands.

History
Blundells Copse was part of an area formerly known as the Moor. In 1992, the site was designated a local nature reserve. In 2005, path widening and improvements were  made to the reserve as of funding by Living Spaces and the Environmental Trust for Berkshire.

Fauna

The site has the following fauna:

Mammals
European hedgehog
Muntjac

Flora
The site has the following flora:

Trees
Alnus glutinosa
Prunus avium
Quercus robur
Fraxinus
Hazel

Plants
Hyacinthoides non-scripta
Chrysosplenium oppositifolium
Caltha palustris
Lamium galeobdolon
Apium nodiflorum
Allium triquetrum
Adoxa moschatellina
Zantedeschia

References

Local Nature Reserves in Berkshire